Weston Downtown Historic District is a national historic district located at Weston, Lewis County, West Virginia. The district includes 58 contributing buildings in the central business district of Weston. Most of the buildings were built between 1875 and 1920, with the earliest dating to about 1845. Notable buildings include the U.S. Post Office (1933–1934), the Art Deco style Citizens Bank of Weston (1930), B&O Railroad Depot / Weston Municipal Building, Camden Building-Weston National Bank (1896–1897), Old Citizen's Bank Building (1893), Bennett House (c. 1830s), Fuccy-Koblegard Building (c. 1901-1905), and the East and West Second Street Truss Bridge (1922). The district includes the separately listed Jonathan M. Bennett House.

It was listed on the National Register of Historic Places in 1985.

References

Art Deco architecture in West Virginia
Buildings and structures in Lewis County, West Virginia
Historic districts in Lewis County, West Virginia
Italianate architecture in West Virginia
National Register of Historic Places in Lewis County, West Virginia
Second Empire architecture in West Virginia
Historic districts on the National Register of Historic Places in West Virginia